Kenneth L. Clark (born May 14, 1978) is a former professional American football wide receiver. He played college football at UCF. Clark played for the Minnesota Vikings in the National Football League for three seasons but had limited game action due to injuries.

Early life and college career
Born in Gainesville, Florida, Clark grew up in Ocala, Florida and graduated from Vanguard High School in 1996. At Vanguard, Clark played football with his cousin, quarterback Daunte Culpepper, who would go on to play professional football. Clark's older brother Steve Rhem also played professional football.

At the University of Central Florida, Clark played at wide receiver for the UCF Knights from 1997 to 2000, graduating with the seventh most receptions (130) and tenth most receiving yards (1,655) in program history.

Professional career
After the 2001 NFL Draft, Clark signed as an undrafted free agent with the Minnesota Vikings on April 23, 2001, again becoming a teammate of his cousin Culpepper. Clark was on the practice squad for most of the 2001 season and missed 2002 with a back injury.

In February 2003, Clark was allocated to the Amsterdam Admirals of NFL Europe, spending the season on the practice squad. Later that year, he would play the only game in his professional career, in which he returned two kickoffs for 33 yards in a 23–13 win over the Detroit Lions on September 21. Due to a back injury, Clark was released from the Vikings with an injury settlement on August 5, 2004. With his settlement, Clark reportedly receives a lifetime annual $250,000 paycheck from the NFL. Since retiring from football, Clark flipped houses in the Atlanta area and donated to Vanguard High School's football program.

References

1978 births
Living people
American football wide receivers
Minnesota Vikings players
UCF Knights football players
Players of American football from Gainesville, Florida
Sportspeople from Ocala, Florida